Crassispira quadrifasciata is a species of sea snail, a marine gastropod mollusk in the family Pseudomelatomidae.

Description
The length of the shell attains 13 mm.

The shape of the shell is pyramidal. The whorls are encircled with a single keel above and below, longitudinally closely ridged in the middle. The keels are whitish, middle of the whorls bluish brown, ridges whitish. The aperture is small. The siphonal canal is very short.

Distribution
This marine species occurs off Southeastern USA; Honduras; Cuba, Jamaica and Northern Brazil

References

 Reeve, Lovell Augustus. Conchologia Iconica: Or, Illustrations of the Shells of Molluscous Animals: III. Reeve, 1845.
 Rosenberg, G. 1992. Encyclopedia of Seashells. Dorset: New York. 224 pp. page(s): 105 
 Espinosa J., Ortea J. & Diez García Y. (2017). Nuevas especies y nuevos registros de moluscos gasterópodos (Mollusca: Gastropoda) marinos de la región oriental de Cuba. Avicennia. 21: 59–67

External links
 
 

quadrifasciata
Gastropods described in 1845